Kildalkey GAA is a Gaelic Athletic Association club located in Kildalkey, County Meath, Ireland. The club is primarily concerned with the game of hurling.

History

Gaelic football had been played in the Kildalkey area in the early years of the 20th century, however, it wasn't until 1910 that Kildalkey Hurling Club was founded. After later affiliating to the Meath County Board, the club had its first success when the Meath MHC title was won in 1927. This was followed by the Meath JHC title in 1930.

Such was the interest in hurling in the area, the club split into two separate clubs in 1935. Both clubs eventually merged in 1939 as Kildalkey Hurling Club once again. Kildalkey went on to win further Meath JHC titles in 1943, 1946, and 1950. The club's first season in the top tier ended with success, with Kildalkey claiming the Meath SHC title, albeit in controversial circumstances.

It was 2009 before Kildalkey won its second Meath SHC overall and its first on the field of play. It was the first of three successive titles. Kildalkey won further titles in 2019 and 2021 after defeats of Kiltale.

Honours

Meath Senior Hurling Championship (6): 1951, 2009, 2010, 2011, 2019, 2021
Meath Junior Hurling Championship (4): 1930, 1943, 1946, 1950
Meath Minor Hurling Championship (2): 1927, 1948

References

External link

 Kildalkey GAA website

Gaelic games clubs in County Meath
Hurling clubs in County Meath